Atzimba Casas Escudero (born 14 September 1994) is an American-born Mexican footballer who plays as a forward for Liga MX Femenil club CD Guadalajara and the Mexico women's national team.

International career
Casas made her senior debut for Mexico on 8 March 2020 in a 2–2 friendly draw against Slovakia.

References

External links 
 

1994 births
Living people
Citizens of Mexico through descent
Mexican women's footballers
Women's association football forwards
Mexico women's international footballers
Liga MX Femenil players
FC Juárez footballers
American women's soccer players
Soccer players from El Paso, Texas
American sportspeople of Mexican descent
UTEP Miners women's soccer players
Competitors at the 2019 Summer Universiade